White City is a town in the southeast Saskatchewan. Situated at the intersection of Highway 48 and the Trans-Canada Highway, the town is part of the White Butte region and neighbours Balgonie, Pilot Butte, and the province's capital city, Regina. White City is primarily populated by people who commute to work in Regina. It’s motto is "Your Way of Life".

History
White City began on  owned by Pilot Butte resident Johnston Lipsett. The community organized as a hamlet on April 26, 1959. It incorporated as a village on March 1, 1967 and then as a town on November 1, 2000. The community was named after White City, London, England when John Kadannek, a local store owner, persuaded Lipsett to name it for the home of his favourite aunt.

Demographics 

Services 
White City is serviced with a library and a Canada Post office.

Education
École White City School and Emerald Ridge Elementary School provide education for kindergarten through 8th grade. Students in grades 9 through 12 are bused 10 minutes northeast to Greenall School in Balgonie.

See also 
Emerald Park, Saskatchewan, adjacent unincorporated community in the Rural Municipality of Edenwold No. 158

References

External links

Edenwold No. 158, Saskatchewan
Towns in Saskatchewan
Division No. 6, Saskatchewan